= Olosada =

Town of ancient Cilicia

Coordinates: 36°53′30″N 32°35′22″E

Olosada was a town of ancient Cilicia, inhabited in Roman times. The name does not occur among ancient authors but is inferred from epigraphic and other evidence.

Its site is located near Afşar Kalesi, Asiatic Turkey, where an ancient theatre has been found.
